The Ministry of Patriots and Veterans Affairs (MPVA) is a ministry under the Government of South Korea which handles veterans. It was established in August 1961 as the Soldiers' Affairs Agency.

List of Ministers

Timeline 

 5 July 1961 – Act for Establishment of Military Relief Administration enacted
 12 May 1962 – Veterans Office Military Relief Office was renamed to Veterans Office, and branch office became regional offices, and 25 local agencies were upgraded to district offices
 1 January 1985 – Veterans Affairs Agency became Ministry of Patriots and Veterans Affairs, regional offices became regional veterans offices or branch veterans offices, and Veterans Committee 4.19 Cemetery Management Office was created
 19 February 1993 – The posts of Director-Generals of Veterans Policy and Veterans Promotion were created
 28 January 1995 – 4.19 Cemetery Management Office was created
 14 September 2002 – City-administered 5.18 cemetery Office and 3.15 cemetery Office were transferred to MPVA and two cemeteries’ level was elevated to national cemetery from municipal cemetery
 24 May 2004 – The Veterans Bureau was newly established to help veterans make a smoother transition to civilian life
 18 May 2005 – The Independence Hall was transferred to MPVA from Ministry of Culture, Sports and Tourism
 26 January 2006 – The Daejeon National Cemetery was transferred to MPVA from Ministry of Defense
 14 January 2007 – Veterans Centers in Seoul, Busan, Daejeon were created
 7 July 2011 – Veterans Center in Gyeonggi Province was created
 28 July 2017 – The status of the MPVA Minister was elevated from vice-ministerial to ministerial level.

See also 
 Ministries of South Korea

References

External links 

 Korean homepage
 English homepage

Government ministries of South Korea
Korea, South
1985 establishments in South Korea